Narjes Emamgholinejad (born 5 July 1984) is an Iranian female sport shooter. She earned a silver medal at the 2010 Asian Games in China and two silver medals at the 2014 Asian Games in South Korea.

References
 Profile at 2014 Asian Games
 Profile at International Shooting Sport Federation
 https://www.tehrantimes.com/news/413396/Iranian-women-shooters-win-gold-and-silver-at-Islamic-Solidarity

1984 births
Living people
Iranian female sport shooters
ISSF rifle shooters
Asian Games silver medalists for Iran
Asian Games medalists in shooting
Shooters at the 2010 Asian Games
Shooters at the 2014 Asian Games
Medalists at the 2010 Asian Games
Medalists at the 2014 Asian Games
People from Amol
Islamic Solidarity Games competitors for Iran
Islamic Solidarity Games medalists in shooting
Sportspeople from Mazandaran province
21st-century Iranian women